Sporting Blood  is a 1940 American drama film, directed by S. Sylvan Simon for Metro-Goldwyn-Mayer. It stars Robert Young, Maureen O'Sullivan, and Lewis Stone.

Plot
In need of money, Myles Vanders returns to his old Virginia home, once a thriving horse farm that has fallen on hard times. Years have gone by but he still is subject to resentment of the community for Myles' father having scandalously run off with neighboring stable owner Davis Lockwood's wife.

Myles manages to persuade Lockwood to lend him $3,000 to train and enter his horse Skipper in an upcoming stakes race. Myles must put up his farm as collateral. Lockwood tells his daughters Linda and Joan not to associate with Myles or trust him. Linda says he should be given a fair chance, while Joan attracts a romantic interest from Myles.

A fire injures Myles's horse and all but ruins his chances for repaying his debt. Things get worse when Joan elopes with a wealthy man while Myles learns a servant of Lockwood's started the fire. A sympathetic Linda offers him her horse, Miss Richmond, to enter in the race. Myles does so, also marrying Linda to incur Lockwood's wrath. She leaves him when she sees this side of Myles, but he comes to his senses, wins her back and wins the race.

Cast
 Robert Young as Myles Vanders
 Maureen O'Sullivan as Linda Lockwood
 Lewis Stone as Davis Lockwood
 William Gargan as Duffy
 Lynne Carver as Joan Locwood
 Clarence Muse as Jeff
 Lloyd Corrigan as Otis Winfield
 George H. Reed as Stonewall
 Tom Kennedy as Grantley

References

External links

1940 films
1940 drama films
American drama films
Films scored by Franz Waxman
Films directed by S. Sylvan Simon
American horse racing films
Metro-Goldwyn-Mayer films
American black-and-white films
1940s English-language films
1940s American films